Paul Natorp (born 16 August 1966) is a Danish sailor. He competed in the men's 470 event at the 1988 Summer Olympics.

References

External links
 

1966 births
Living people
Danish male sailors (sport)
Olympic sailors of Denmark
Sailors at the 1988 Summer Olympics – 470
People from Sønderborg Municipality
Sportspeople from the Region of Southern Denmark